The Asia/Oceania Zone was one of three zones of regional competition in the 2009 Fed Cup.

Group I
Venue: State Tennis Centre, Perth, Western Australia (outdoor hard)
Dates: 4–7 February

The eight teams were divided into two pools of four teams. The teams that finished first in the pools played-off to determine which team would partake in the World Group II Play-offs. The two nations coming last in the pools also played-off to determine which would be relegated to Group II for 2010.

Pools

Play-offs

  advanced to 2009 World Group II Play-offs.
  was relegated to Group II for 2010.

Group II
Venue: State Tennis Center, Perth, Western Australia (hard - outdoors)
Date: 4–6 February

The four teams played in one pool of four, with the team placing first advancing to Group I for 2010.

Pool

  advanced to Group I for 2010.

Previously, Pacific Oceania, Philippines, Sri Lanka, Syria and Turkmenistan had also been listed to compete.

See also
 Fed Cup structure

References

 Fed Cup Profile, Australia
 Fed Cup Profile, South Korea
 Fed Cup Profile, Kazakhstan
 Fed Cup Profile, India
 Fed Cup Profile, Chinese Taipei
 Fed Cup Profile, New Zealand
 Fed Cup Profile, Hong Kong
 Fed Cup Profile, Singapore
 Fed Cup Profile, Indonesia

External links
 Fed Cup website

 
Asia Oceania
Sports competitions in Perth, Western Australia
Tennis tournaments in Australia
2009 in Australian tennis